Boadicea flavimacula is a moth of the subfamily Arctiinae first described by Pinhey in 1968. It is found in Zimbabwe.

References

Endemic fauna of Zimbabwe
Moths described in 1968
Lithosiini
Lepidoptera of Zimbabwe